Rahul Bhatia (born 24 November 1998) is a cricketer who plays for the United Arab Emirates national cricket team. In May 2022, he was named in United Arab Emirates' One Day International (ODI) squad for the 2022 United States Tri-Nation Series. He made his ODI debut on 1 June 2022, against the United States. Before making his ODI debut, he had previously played for the United Arab Emirates XI team, also against the United States, during the USA's tour of the UAE in March 2019.

References

External links
 

1998 births
Living people
Emirati cricketers
United Arab Emirates One Day International cricketers
Sportspeople from Dubai
Indian expatriate sportspeople in the United Arab Emirates